Get It Together is a studio album by American rock band The Supersuckers. It was released on November 25, 2008, by Mid-Fi Records on Compact Disc, vinyl record. Some copies were released with an additional DVD that included a live performance at the House of Blues in Anaheim, California, on September 19, 2007.

Track listing
 "What It Takes" – 3:45
 "Anything Else" – 3:00
 "Listen Up" – 3:20
 "Paid" – 4:11
 "She Is Leaving" – 3:40
 "When I Go, I'm Gone" – 3:13
 "I'm a Fucking Genius" – 1:53
 "Sunset on Sunday" – 3:16
 "Breaking Honey's Heart" – 3:12
 "Something Good for You" – 4:15
 "I Like It All, Man" – 1:37
 "Come Along for the Ride" – 2:50

Personnel
 Dan Bolton – bass, guitar (electric), vocals
 Billy Joe Bowers – percussion, vocals (background)
 Scott Churilla – drums
 David Fisher – vocals (background)
 Rontrose Heathman – guitar (acoustic), guitar (electric), vocals
 Mike Musburger – drums
 Mickey Raphael – harmonica
 Eddie Spaghetti – bass, guitar (acoustic), vocals

Recording and production 
 Billy Joe Bowers – producer
 Jessika Daly – composer
 Tim Gabor – art direction, illustrations
 Eddie Spaghetti – liner notes

References

Supersuckers albums
2008 albums